Intersectin-2 is a protein that in humans is encoded by the ITSN2 gene.

This gene encodes a cytoplasmic protein which contains SH3 domains. This protein is a member of a family of proteins involved in clathrin-mediated endocytosis. Intersectin 2 is thought to regulate the formation of clathrin-coated vesicles and also may function in the induction of T cell antigen receptor (TCR) endocytosis. Alternatively spliced transcript variants have been found for this gene that encode three distinct isoforms. Additional variants have been found but their full length nature has not been determined.

Interactions
ITSN2 has been shown to interact with Wiskott-Aldrich syndrome protein.

References

Further reading

EH-domain-containing proteins